"Apache" is a song written by Jerry Lordan and first recorded by Bert Weedon. Lordan played the song on ukulele to the Shadows while on tour, and liking the song, the group released their own version which topped the UK Singles Chart for five weeks in mid-1960. The Shadows' guitarist Hank Marvin developed the song's distinctive echo and vibrato sound. After hearing the Shadows' version, Danish guitarist Jørgen Ingmann released a cover of the song in November 1960 which peaked at number 2 on the Billboard Hot 100 in the US.

A 1973 version by the Incredible Bongo Band has been called "hip-hop's national anthem". Although this version was not a hit on release, its long percussion break has been sampled countless times on hip hop and dance tracks since the 1980s. In March 2005, Q magazine placed "Apache" by the Shadows at number 96 on its list of the 100 Greatest Guitar Tracks.

Composition and original recording
English songwriter and composer Jerry Lordan came up with the tune in the late 1950s. Lordan was inspired to write the song after watching the 1954 American western film Apache, saying that he "wanted something noble and dramatic, reflecting the courage and savagery of the Indian Apache warrior Massai, played by Burt Lancaster.

It was originally recorded by British guitarist Bert Weedon in early 1960, but remained unreleased for several months due to promotion and release problems. However, Lordan did not like Weedon's version of the song, as he thought it was too jaunty. For this reason, whilst on tour with Cliff Richard and the Shadows, Lordan played the song on his ukulele to the Shadows, who liked the song and recorded it in June, quickly releasing it in July 1960.

Around the same time as the Shadows' release of "Apache", Weedon's record label Top Rank finally released his version. Reviewing for Disc, Don Nicholl wrote that Weedon "gets the right mood and atmosphere as he works with drums on this Indian item. There's a flute in the background, too – to give the idea for the raiding party's whoops maybe. A dark noise". The single peaked at number 24 on the UK Singles Chart. After the success of the Shadows' version, Hank Marvin and Bruce Welch wrote "Mr. Guitar" for Weedon as a recompense for overshadowing his version of the song.

Track listing
7": Top Rank / JAR-415
 "Apache" – 2:37
 "Lonely Guitar" – 2:10

Charts

The Shadows version

Recording
The recording was done at the EMI Abbey Road Studios in London. Singer-guitarist Joe Brown had bought an Italian-built tape echo unit that he did not like and gave it to The Shadows' guitarist Hank Marvin, who developed a distinctive sound using it and the tremolo arm of his Fender Stratocaster. Bruce Welch borrowed an acoustic Gibson J-200 guitar from Cliff Richard, the heavy melodic bass was performed by Jet Harris, and drums by Tony Meehan. Richard himself played a Chinese drum at the beginning and end to provide an atmosphere of stereotypically Native American music.

Release and reception
"Apache" was released with the B-side being an instrumental version of the traditional army song "The Quartermaster's Store". The band humorously renamed the song "Quatermasster’s Stores" in reference to the television serial Quatermass and it was arranged by Bill Shepherd.

Record producer and A&R man Norrie Paramor preferred "Quatermasster’s Stores" over "Apache" and wanted it to be released as the A-side. However, he changed his mind after his daughter preferred "Apache".

It has been cited by a generation of guitarists as inspirational and is considered one of the most influential British rock 45s of the pre-Beatles era. In a 1963 NME article, The Shadows said, "What's the most distinctive sound of our group?  We often wondered what it is ourselves. Really, it is the sound we had when we recorded 'Apache' – that kind of Hawaiian sounding lead guitar ... plus the beat".

In March 2005, Q magazine placed "Apache" by the Shadows at number 96 on its list of the 100 Greatest Guitar Tracks.

UK chart history 
The Shadows' "Apache" entered the UK top 40 on 21 July 1960 at number 35, climbing into the top 20 the following week. A fortnight later, the song rose twelve places to number 3 and, on 25 August, deposed "Please Don't Tease" – on which The Shadows backed Cliff Richard – to begin a five-week run at number 1.

On 29 September, "Apache" dropped to number 2, replaced by "Tell Laura I Love Her" by Ricky Valance. The Shadows version proved to be an enduring hit, enjoying a 19-week run in the top 40 which concluded on 24 November, reappearing for one more week on 8 December. During this run, the group's follow-up single "Man of Mystery"/"The Stranger" peaked at number 5, alongside the number 3 success of "Nine Times Out of Ten" (backing Cliff Richard).

According to the UK Official Charts Company, "Apache" was the 28th best-selling single of the 1960s.

Track listing
7": Columbia / DB 4484
 "Apache" – 2:56
 "Quatermasster's Stores" – 2:20

Personnel 
Hank Marvin – lead guitar
Bruce Welch – acoustic guitar
Jet Harris – bass guitar
Cliff Richard – Chinese drum
Tony Meehan – drums

Charts

Jørgen Ingmann version

Danish guitarist Jørgen Ingmann recorded a cover of "Apache" in October 1960 after hearing the Shadows' version, which had recently been released in Denmark. Ingmann had been looking for a B-side to his self-penned song "Echo Boogie" and decided that "Apache" would work. He played all instruments on both tracks, as well as mixing and producing them.

Release and reception
Released in Denmark at the beginning of November by Metronome Records, it was quickly released in the US by ATCO along with a big advertising campaign, where the single was credited as 'Jorgen Ingmann and His Guitar'.

The single entered the Billboard Hot 100 in the final week of January 1961 and peaked at number 2 ten weeks later at the beginning of April for two weeks behind "Blue Moon" by the Marcels. In Canada, "Apache" topped the CHUM Chart for two weeks in March 1961. Ingmann would go on to have a smaller hit in North America with "Anna", which peaked at number 54 in the US and number 34 in Canada June 1961.

Cliff Richard has said that "Ingmann put in a few tricky bits, but essentially it was a cover job. If the Shads had made the charts there [in the US] with 'Apache', things might have been very different for us".

Track listing
7": ATCO / 6184 (US and Canada)
 "Apache" – 3:00
 "Echo Boogie" – 3:13

Charts

Incredible Bongo Band version

A 1973 version by Michael Viner and a funk group called the Incredible Bongo Band added a bongo drum introduction and included more percussion. The drum break was played by Jim Gordon. Although this version was not a hit on its initial release, it became heavily sampled in early hip hop music, including by Afrika Bambaataa, who cited its influence. It has been sampled by hip hop performers such as The Sugarhill Gang, L.L. Cool J, The Roots and Nas, techno performers The Future Sound of London and Moby, and drum and bass acts J Majik and Goldie.

The 2013 documentary Sample This, directed by Dan Forrer and narrated by Gene Simmons, recounts the story of The Incredible Bongo Band and its recording of "Apache".

The Sugarhill Gang version

In 1981, the rap group known as the Sugarhill Gang covered the Incredible Bongo Band's version of the song on its second album, 8th Wonder. In 1982, this version peaked at No. 53 on the Billboard Hot 100, No. 51 on the US Dance chart, and No. 13 on the US R&B chart. In 1995, this version was featured in "Viva Lost Wages", a sixth-season episode of an American sitcom The Fresh Prince of Bel-Air, and then in "Whoops, There It Is", a subsequent clip show from the series. Using the distinctive beat and bongo drums as well as Native American war cries, the Sugarhill Gang added rap lyrics with references including the following:
The Lone Ranger (a.k.a. "kemosabe") is mentioned extensively, as well as his sidekick ("Tonto, jump on it! Jump on it! Jump on it!") and his horse (Hi-yo, Silver!' is what I say").
The lyric "Now what you hear is not a test" recalls the Sugarhill Gang's earlier hit, "Rapper's Delight".
The instrumental "Popcorn" by Hot Butter (who had released a version of "Apache" as a follow-up to "Popcorn") is referenced via the lyric "(What's that?) Hot buttered popcorn!"
The recording engineer for Sugar Hill Records, Steve Jerome, was also a member and engineer for "Popcorn" by Hot Butter.
The popcorn and its butter are referenced in lyrics right beforehand, recalling a 1976 Mazola margarine commercial "We Call It Maize" featuring a Native American woman.
The "Monster Mash" is mentioned in this song, as well as the Jerk.

A reworked version of this song for children titled simply "Jump on It!" is featured as the title track on the Sugarhill Gang's album Jump on It!. This song differs from the original version with the signature "Jump on it" line being replaced by "Jump up", lyrics encouraging children to learn science, mathematics, and English, and a stronger funk influence.

Other songs sampling the Incredible Bongo Band version
 DJ Grandmaster Flash interpolated parts of the Incredible Bongo Band song "Apache" in his song "The Adventures of Grandmaster Flash on the Wheels of Steel".
West Street Mob, a group on the Sugar Hill Records label, made a song which interpolated parts of the "Apache" song by the Incredible Bongo Band; this song was called "Break Dance (Electric Boogie)".
Boogie Down Productions sampled the break in their 1992 track "Who Are The Pimps?"
Young MC sampled the break in his 1988 rap "Know How", mixed with Isaac Hayes' "Theme From Shaft".
MC Zappa sampled various portions of the Incredible Bongo Band version of "Apache" in his song "Supperhero" from his 2020 EP Hindsight.
MC Hammer sampled the bongo loop in his track "Turn This Mutha Out", off the 1988 album Let's Get It Started.
Vanilla Ice sampled "Apache" in his hit song "Ninja Rap". It was also sampled in the Ultimix version of "Ice Ice Baby".
C + C Music Factory sample the start of "Apache" in the song "Things That Make You Go Hmmm..."
 In 1996, Sir Mix-A-Lot played off the lyrics to the Sugarhill Gang's version of "Apache" in his hit "Jump on It", released on the album Return of the Bumpasaurus. The lyrics contain the names of several cities in the United States.
It was used as the beat and background music on the song "We Run This" on Missy Elliott's album The Cookbook.
 The soundtrack of the 2000 film Snatch has an extract of a DJ mix CD (On the Floor at the Boutique) by Fatboy Slim, which contained the Incredible Bongo Band version of "Apache".
The Beastie Boys used a sample from the Incredible Bongo Band version of "Apache" in their live version of "Root Down" – most notably the version that appears on the Tibetan Freedom Concert live album.
It was also used in the original version of "Can I Get Witcha" by The Notorious B.I.G.
The British blues singer Amy Winehouse used a sample from "Apache" in her song "In My Bed" produced by Salaam Remi for her 2003 album Frank. Salaam Remi also utilized "Apache" for sampling when he produced NY Rapper Nas' hit single "Made You Look" from his 2002 release God's Son.
UK rapper M.I.A. made "Apache" the center of her 2005 Radio One B-side "Apache Riddim".
 In 2005, Switch extensively sampled the covered version by Michael Viner's Incredible Bongo Band for his track "A Bit Patchy" (wordplay on "Apache"). The track has since been used to advertise William Hill Online on TV and has been remixed by artists such as Eric Prydz and Sinden.
Nas sampled IBB's "Apache" in his 2003 single, "Made You Look", and on his 2006 single "Hip Hop Is Dead".
Also in 2006, The Federation sampled a piece of the song for their single "I Only Wear My White Tees Once".
Sampled on the song "Funky" by DJ Shadow and Cut Chemist on their 2007 collaboration, "The Hard Sell".
It is used in the song "Against All Odds" by Chase & Status featuring Kano.
The Roots sample the bongo break at the beginning for their song "Thought @ Work" from their album Phrenology, which is an homage to "Men at Work" by Kool G Rap and DJ Polo, which also samples the break.
Double Dee and Steinski sampled the bongo break for their classic mash-up/collage "Lesson 1 – The Payoff Mix".
Madonna incorporated the bongo samples to "Into the Groove" during her 2008–2009 Sticky & Sweet Tour.
TLC sampled the bongo loop in the video version of their song, "Hat 2 Da Back".
Petter Askergren used bongo samples in his cover of Thomas Di Leva's hit "Dansa din djävul".
Rage Against the Machine interpolated parts of the percussion break in their cover of "Renegades of Funk".
Hip hop artists Jay-Z and Kanye West sampled the bongo drums on their track "That's My Bitch" from their 2011 collaborative album, Watch the Throne.

Other cover versions

Charting versions
 In February 1961, Sonny James released a vocal music version, which was produced in Nashville by Chet Atkins and was review-rated as a Spotlight Winner in Billboard. It peaked at number 87 on the Billboard Hot 100 and number 23 on the retrospective Australian Kent Music Report.
In December 1964, Dave Allan and the Arrows released a cover as "Apache '65". It peaked at number 64 on the Billboard Hot 100.
In November 1970, English progressive rock group the Edgar Broughton Band released a single "Apache Drop Out", which combined "Apache" with a version of Captain Beefheart's "Drop Out Boogie". The highly unorthodox single reached number 33 on the UK Singles Chart and number 42 in Germany.
In October 1972, the Moog-based band of session musicians Hot Butter released a cover version of "Apache" as follow-up to their hit "Popcorn". It peaked at number 51 on the UK Singles Chart and number 37 in Germany.
In 1987, Dutch band Janse Bagge Bend released a version titled "Awpatsje (Apache)", which peaked at number 83 on the Dutch Single Top 100 chart.
In 2005, the German band Scooter covered this song as an instrumental for the album Who's Got The Last Laugh Now? in a techno version. Later that year, a single was released which combined elements of "Apache" and "Rock Bottom" from the same album, known as "Apache Rocks the Bottom!". This later appeared on the second disc of the UK edition of its 2008 album Jumping All Over the World. The single was a top-five hit in Denmark and Finland and a top-thirty hit in Germany and Austria.

Other versions 
 In 1960, Jerry Lordan recorded his own version together with the Johnnie Spence Orchestra.
 In 1961, Si Zentner released a version on his Big Band Plays the Big Hits album, along with "Up a Lazy River".
In 1962, The Ventures released a version on their album The Ventures Play Telstar and the Lonely Bull.
 In 1969, Eyes of Blue released a version titled "Apache '69" under the name the Imposters. The B-side of this Mercury label release (MF1080) was the song "QIII".
 In 1976, the electro-rock French band Rockets, in their first eponymous album, released a version featuring synthesizers, disco-rock drumming, and heavily treated guitars.
In the 1970s, the Tennessee Farm Band did a version.
In 1977, The Tommy Seebach Band recorded a disco-styled version and filmed an accompanying music video of "Apache". Set on a rocky hillside, it featured scantily clad dancers around a grinning Tommy Seebach while he plays keyboards. This version was successful in Europe.
 Black Sabbath (with Tony Martin on vocals) played a live cover of the song at their 1989 concert in Moscow.
 Ska-Dows recorded a ska version of "Apache", including some lyrics, mostly the word "Apache!" shouted repeatedly.
Link Wray, himself of Native American descent, performed the song on his 1990 album of the same name.
 The 1992 compilation album Ruby Trax features a version of "Apache" by Senseless Things.
 In 1992, Norwegian a cappella group Bjelleklang recorded their version of "Apache" on the album Holiholihoo.
 In 1993, General Base, one of the projects of Thomas Kukula, released "Apache" as a single; it also appears on the First album.
 The California Guitar Trio covered "Apache" for their 1995 album, Invitation.
 The song was covered by Ritchie Blackmore in the 1996 collection Twang!: A Tribute to Hank Marvin & the Shadows.
 In 2002, Portishead's Geoff Barrow and Adrian Utley recorded a cover version which was released on limited white, green, pink and black vinyl 7-inch single under the name The Jimi Entley Sound.
 In 2003, Jimmy Thackery covered "Apache" for his album Guitar.
On the 2006 album Hier is Normaal, the Dutch band Normaal made a compilation of instrumental songs of their own and other artists. "Apache" is also in it. The song, "Varkens Pesten", means literally "bullying pigs".
French guitarist Jean-Pierre Danel recorded a version of "Apache" on his No. 1 hit album Guitar Connection (Sony Music) in 2006. The album went platinum and included a DVD on which Danel shows how to play the songs, including "Apache".
In 2010, Cisco Herzhaft performs a solo version in fingerpicking on his album The Cisco's System.
"Apache" was covered by the folk band 17 Hippies on their 2007 album Heimlich.

Notable live covers
Junior Brown regularly performs "Apache" in his live shows.
 In 2010, Jeff Beck performed a version of "Apache" during his tribute concert for Les Paul in New York City; it was released in February 2011 on the CD Jeff Beck's Rock n' Roll Party Honoring Les Paul, and also performed on the DVD/Blu-ray release of the same concert, also released in February 2011.

Interpolations
Wyclef Jean's "Masquerade" includes the melodic hook played on violin as the song closes.
 "Symphony of the Nymph" (2012) by Ariel Pink's Haunted Graffiti features a melody from "Apache".
 David Bowie borrowed part of the melody of Apache for the chorus of the song "How Does the Grass Grow?" from his 2013 album The Next Day.

Soundtrack appearances
 A 30-second edit of The Shadows' version was used in an April 1988 UK TV advertisement for Tango fizzy drinks.
 An 80-second edit of The Shadows' version was used in the 1989 feature film Scandal about the Profumo affair.
 A 60-second portion of a remastered version by The Shadows was used in the 2012/13 UK TV advert for Mattessons 'Fridge Raiders' snack. It is known as the 'You must be Hank Marvin' advert, reflecting the rhyming slang term for 'starving'.  
 A version of "Apache" was used as the theme to the long-running television show Wild Chicago, which aired in Chicago on PBS.
 Another 30-second sampled version by The Incredible Bongo Band is used in a 2018 TIAA commercial.
 Various versions are used in commercials for Jardiance.
 The song was going to be used in the 2019 film Joker but was cut.

Minnesota Lynx
The Minnesota Lynx of the WNBA adopted "Apache" as the unofficial team anthem in 2007. Following victories, the team would dance to the song at center court. For the first home game of the team's first WNBA Finals appearance, the team brought in the Sugarhill Gang to perform the song at halftime.

References

External links
soul-sides.com: All Roads Lead to Apache (history of various versions of "Apache", including audio samples)

1960 songs
1960 singles
1981 singles
Rock instrumentals
UK Singles Chart number-one singles
Sonny James songs
Surf instrumentals
Incredible Bongo Band songs
The Sugarhill Gang songs
Songs written by Jerry Lordan
The Shadows songs
Sir Mix-a-Lot songs
Songs about Native Americans
Columbia Graphophone Company singles
Metronome Records singles
Atco Records singles
Sugar Hill Records (Hip-Hop label) singles
Song recordings produced by Norrie Paramor
1960s instrumentals
Minnesota Lynx